Agonidium leleupi is a species of ground beetle in the subfamily Platyninae. It was described by Basilewsky in 1951.

References

leleupi
Beetles described in 1951